Eduard Čech  (29 June 1893 – 15 March 1960) was a Czech mathematician. His research interests included projective differential geometry and topology. He is especially known for the technique known as Stone–Čech compactification (in topology) and the notion of Čech cohomology. He was the first to publish a proof of Tychonoff's theorem in 1937.

Biography
He was born in Stračov, then in Bohemia, Austria-Hungary, now in the Czech Republic. His father was Čeněk Čech, a policeman, and his mother was Anna Kleplová.

After attending the gymnasium in Hradec Králové, Čech was admitted to the Philosophy Faculty of Charles University of Prague in 1912. In 1915 he was drafted into the Austro-Hungarian Army and participated in World War I, after which he completed his undergraduate degree in 1918. He received his doctoral degree in 1920 at Charles University; his thesis, titled On Curves and Plane Elements of the Third Order, was written under the direction of Karel Petr. In 1921–1922 he collaborated with Guido Fubini in Turin, Italy. He taught at Masaryk University in Brno and at Charles University. Ivo Babuška, Vlastimil Dlab, Zdeněk Frolík, Věra Trnková, and Petr Vopěnka have been doctoral students of Čech.

He attended the First International Topological Conference held in Moscow 4–10 September 1935. He made two presentations there: "Accessibility and homology" and "Betti groups with different coefficient groups".

He died in Prague in 1960.

Publications

See also
Čech closure operator
Čech cohomology
Čech nerve
Stone–Čech compactification
Tychonoff's theorem

References

External links

 List of publications from Czech Digital Mathematics Library

1893 births
1960 deaths
People from Hradec Králové District
People from the Kingdom of Bohemia
Czech mathematicians
20th-century Czech mathematicians
Topologists
Charles University alumni
Institute for Advanced Study visiting scholars
Academic staff of Masaryk University
Academic staff of Charles University
Austro-Hungarian military personnel of World War I